Over Compton is a village and civil parish in north west Dorset, England, situated in the Yeo valley  east of Yeovil. In the 2011 census the parish had a population of 183.

Compton House, formerly the home of the Goodden family, lies outside the village. St Michael's Church is on the estate. The MCC cricketer Cecil Goodden was born in Compton House.

Notes

External links

 Dorset OPC - Nether and Over Compton

Villages in Dorset